The Original Human Being is Blue Cheer's fifth album. It was released in 1970 and shows Blue Cheer exploring a more psychedelic and laid‑back rock and roll with horn sections on a few of the songs. This album features a very unusual, and different, song for Blue Cheer: "Babaji (Twilight Raga)", which features extensive use of sitar and synthesizer. These instruments were only used one other time in the song "I'm the Light" on the album Oh! Pleasant Hope.

Track listing
Side one
"Good Times Are So Hard to Find" (Kent Housman, Norman Mayell) – 3:22
"Love of a Woman" (Dickie Peterson) – 4:35
"Make Me Laugh" (Ralph Burns Kellogg) – 5:06
"Pilot" (Gary R. Grelecki, Gary Lee Yoder) – 4:49
"Babaji (Twilight Raga)" (Mayell) – 3:46 (instrumental)

Side two
"Preacher" (Grelecki, Yoder) – 4:01
"Black Sun" (Grelecki, Yoder) – 3:31
"Tears in My Bed" (Kellogg) – 2:06
"Man on the Run" (Peterson) – 3:58
"Sandwich" (Grelecki, Yoder) – 5:01
"Rest at Ease" (Grelecki, Yoder) – 5:35

Personnel
Blue Cheer
Dickie Peterson – bass, guitar, lead vocals (tracks 2, 3, 9)
Gary Lee Yoder – guitar, harmonica, vocals, harp, lead vocals (tracks 1, 4–8, 10–11), producer
Ralph Burns Kellogg – organ, piano, synthesizer, bass
Norman Mayell – drums, guitar, percussion, sitar, producer on track 1

Production
Eric Albronda – producer
Mark Harman, George Horn – engineers
Russ Gary – mixing and editing at Wally Heider Studios, San Francisco, California

References

1970 albums
Blue Cheer albums
Philips Records albums